Joy Ride is a 2023 American comedy film directed by Adele Lim, in her feature directorial debut, and written by Cherry Chevapravatdumrong and Teresa Hsiao, from a story by Lim, Chevapravatdumrong and Hsiao. The film stars Ashley Park, Sherry Cola, Stephanie Hsu, and Sabrina Wu.

The film was announced in 2018 following the announcement of the deal between Point Grey Pictures and Lionsgate, with Lim being confirmed as director in 2021. The cast was announced between August and October of the same year, and filming took place in British Columbia throughout the latter month.

Joy Ride had its world premiere at SXSW on March 17, 2023, and is set to be released in the United States on July 7, 2023, by Lionsgate Films.

Premise
Audrey, Lolo, Kat, and Deadeye are four Asian-American women who travel through Asia in search of Audrey's birth mother.

Cast
 Ashley Park as Audrey 
 Sherry Cola as Lolo 
 Stephanie Hsu as Kat 
 Sabrina Wu as Deadeye 
 Ronny Chieng
 Lori Tan Chinn
 David Denman as Audrey's adoptive father
 Annie Mumolo as Audrey's adoptive mother
 Desmond Chiam as Clarence
 Alexander Hodge as Todd
 Chris Pang

Production
On August 9, 2018, it was announced that Seth Rogen and Evan Goldberg were in negotiations to partner with Lionsgate through their production company Point Grey Pictures in a first-look deal to develop film and television projects. On July 9, 2021, it was announced that screenwriter Adele Lim would make her feature directorial debut on an untitled R-rated comedy film from that deal, with Ashley Park joining the cast. The film was written by Cherry Chevapravatdumrong and Teresa Hsiao, based on a story they developed with Lim. Chevapravatdumrong, Hsiao, and Lim also produce alongside Rogen, Goldberg, James Weaver, and Josh Fagen. In a statement, Lim said, "This journey began with me, Cherry, and Teresa wanting to tell a story with characters who look like us, about women who are messy and thirsty, but have so much heart. Point Grey and Lionsgate have been incredible allies and partners from day one, and I am thrilled to be making my directing debut with them on a story that's so special to me."

In August 2021, Sherry Cola and Stephanie Hsu were added to the cast. In September, it was reported that Sabrina Wu would star as the fourth and final lead in the film. Filming began by October, with Desmond Chiam, Alexander Hodge, and Chris Pang joining the cast. On October 7, a lewd playground serving as a set for the film was spotted in Maple Ridge, British Columbia. In February 2023, the film's title was revealed to be Joy Ride.

Release 
Joy Ride premiered at SXSW on March 17, 2023.  It is scheduled to be theatrically released on July 7, 2023, by Lionsgate Films. It was originally scheduled to be released on June 23.

References

External links
 

2023 adventure films
2023 comedy films
2023 directorial debut films
2023 independent films
2020s adventure comedy films
2020s American films
2020s buddy comedy films
2020s English-language films
2020s female buddy films
American adventure comedy films
American buddy comedy films
American female buddy films
American independent films
Comedy films about Asian Americans
Films produced by Evan Goldberg
Films produced by Seth Rogen
Films shot in British Columbia
Lionsgate films
Point Grey Pictures films